An election was held on 21 November 1970 to elect 32 of the 60 seats in the Australian Senate. This is the most recent occasion on which a Senate election has been held with no accompanying election to the House of Representatives; the two election cycles had been out of synchronisation since 1963.

Key dates

Results

The governing Coalition and the opposition Australian Labor Party won 13 and 14 seats respectively, resulting in a total of 26 seats each, while the Democratic Labor Party and three independents (two newly elected) held the remaining seats.

Notes
 In New South Wales and Queensland, the coalition parties ran a joint ticket. Of the four senators elected on a joint ticket, three were members of the Liberal Party and one was a member of the Country Party. In Western Australia, the coalition parties ran on separate tickets. In South Australia, Tasmania, and Victoria, only the Liberal Party ran a ticket.
 Two independents were elected – Michael Townley of Tasmania and Syd Negus of Western Australia. This brought the total number of independents in the Senate to three, the other being Reg Turnbull of Tasmania.

See also
 Candidates of the Australian Senate election, 1970
 Members of the Australian Senate, 1971–1974

References

External links
University of WA  election results in Australia since 1890

Australian Senate elections
1970 elections in Australia
November 1970 events in Australia